The Danish Police Federation ( is a trade union representing police in Denmark.

The union was founded in either 1998 or 1999, with the merger of the original Danish Police Federation, the Danish Criminal Police Federation, and the Police and Civil Service Association.  The union joined the Confederation of Professionals in Denmark, and since 2019 it has been affiliated to its successor, the Danish Trade Union Confederation.  The union is also a member of the Civil Servants' Central Organization II.  In 2018, it had 11,815 members.

External links

References

Trade unions in Denmark
Trade unions established in the 1990s